Clarendon County is one of the 141 Cadastral divisions of New South Wales. It contains the towns of Gundagai, Junee and Bethungra. The Murrumbidgee River is the boundary to the south.

Clarendon County was named in honour of George William Frederick Villiers, 4th Earl Clarendon (1800-1870).

Parishes within this county
A full list of parishes found within this county; their current LGA and mapping coordinates to the approximate centre of each location is as follows:

References

Counties of New South Wales